This is a list of Dragon Award nominees.

Novels

Best Science Fiction Novel
  *   Winner(s)
  ∞   Nomination declined

Best Fantasy Novel
  *   Winner(s)
  ∞   Nomination declined

Best Young Adult / Middle Grade Novel
  *   Winner(s)
  ∞   Nomination declined

Best Military Science Fiction or Fantasy Novel
  *   Winner(s)
  ∞   Nomination declined

Best Alternate History Novel
  *   Winner(s)
  ∞   Nomination declined

Best Apocalyptic Novel

The category "Best Apocalyptic Novel" was removed from the awards in 2018.

  *   Winner(s)
  ∞   Nomination declined

Best Media Tie-In Novel

The category "Best Media Tie-In Novel" was first introduced in 2018.

  *   Winner(s)
  ∞   Nomination declined

Best Horror Novel
  *   Winner(s)
  ∞   Nomination declined

Comic Books and Graphic Novels

Best Comic Book
  *   Winner(s)
  ∞   Nomination declined

Best Graphic Novel
  *   Winner(s)
  ∞   Nomination declined

Television and Film

Best Science Fiction or Fantasy TV Series
  *   Winner(s)
  ∞   Nomination declined

Best Science Fiction or Fantasy Movie
  *   Winner(s)
  ∞   Nomination declined

Games

Best Science Fiction or Fantasy PC/Console Game
  *   Winner(s)
  ∞   Nomination declined

Best Science Fiction or Fantasy Mobile Game
  *   Winner(s)
  ∞   Nomination declined

Best Science Fiction or Fantasy Board Game
  *   Winner(s)
  ∞   Nomination declined

Best Science Fiction or Fantasy Miniatures / Collectible Card / Role-Playing Game
  *   Winner(s)
  ∞   Nomination declined

References

Awards established in 2016
Board game awards
Fantasy awards
Fiction awards
American film awards
Game awards
Science fiction awards
American television awards
Video game awards